Bimbilla is the capital town of Nanumba North District, a district in the Northern Region of Ghana. It is located in the East of the region, and is near the Oti River.

History
Bimbila was founded by Naa Mnantambo (son of Na Gbewa) after moving south from his brother Sitobu who founded the present day Dagomba state. The new state was subsequently called Nanung which came from the Dagbani words "Na" (King or Chief) and "Nua" (Hand). Na Sitobu is said to have pointed his hand south and Na Mnatambo and his followers went in the direction indicated by the hand. So "Na Nua" (The King's hand) became Nanumba. Among the towns created in the early period around 1350 were Nakpa, Bakpaba, Joanayili, Dokpam, Chamba, Gbingbalga, Darayili, and Wulensi all Nanumba towns in northern Ghana. Salaga was a later addition which was taken by the Gonja and turned into a commercial capital. Bimbila was attacked and burnt down by the German colonial army on 29 November 1896 as precursor to the great battle of Adibo against the Dagomba army. Today Bimbila is district capital of the Nanumba North district.

Education
It has a teachers training college set up by the Evangelical Presbyterian Church in 1962; it's now called  E.P. College of education. It's al has one secondary school which is a day school and one Vocational training School which service many small villages/towns. Most of its successful inhabitants would have schooled in Yendi or Tamale as in the past the secondary school was deemed to be less endowed.

Transport
Bimbila is connected by road to the towns of Salaga and Yendi. A road to Nkwanta is being funded $50 million by the European Union.

Chieftaincy dispute and unrest 
On June 19, 2014, the chief of Bimbila Naa Abdulai Dasana Andani was shot and killed in his palace after Islamic evening prayers. This murder led to the imposition of a 12-hour curfew from 6 pm to 6 am on the town.

References

Populated places in the Northern Region (Ghana)